Kamali (also Romanized as Kamālī) is a village in Kheyrgu Rural District, Alamarvdasht District, Lamerd County, Fars Province, Iran. At the 2006 census, its population was 1,236, in 248 families. Kamali mostly has a Ghiasi Relatives and its climate is hot and dry

References 

Populated places in Lamerd County